Isaac Evolue Etue Bofenda Bonga (born November 8, 1999) is a German professional basketball player who is playing for FC Bayern München of the German Basketball Bundesliga and the EuroLeague. Standing , he began his professional career with Skyliners Frankfurt of the Basketball Bundesliga. Born in Neuwied, Bonga represents the senior German national team in international competitions. He was selected by the Philadelphia 76ers (second round, 39th overall) and immediately traded to the Los Angeles Lakers in the 2018 NBA draft.

Early life
Bonga was born in Neuwied, Germany to parents originally from Kinshasa, Democratic Republic of the Congo. His father emigrated to Germany in the early 1990s with plans to move to Canada, but he instead stayed in the country and began living in Frankfurt and then Koblenz. Bonga's older brother Tarsis plays association football for VfL Bochum, while his younger brother Joshua also plays basketball. At age seven, Bonga began playing streetball in Neuwied, and two years later, he joined the local club.

Amateur career
Bonga is a product of Post SV Koblenz, and logged his first minutes in senior basketball during the 2014–15 season, when competing in Germany's fifth-tier level 2 Regionalliga with SG Lützel-Post Koblenz. After winning the championship with the team, and earning a league promotion to the fourth division (Regionalliga), he saw action in 24 games during the 2015–16 Regionalliga season, averaging 5.9 points, 2.8 rebounds and 2 assists per contest. He also represented the under-19 squad of Eintracht Frankfurt, in Germany's top-junior division NBBL.

Professional career

Skyliners Frankfurt (2016–2018)
In June 2016, Bonga signed a four-year deal with Skyliners Frankfurt of the Basketball Bundesliga. He was invited to the NBA Top 100 camp in Charlottesville, Virginia, the same month. Bonga was one of the top European prospects to be picked to attend the 2016 Basketball without Borders Camp Europe in Helsinki in September 2016.

Bonga made his Bundesliga debut for the Skyliners at age 16 on September 23, 2016, in an 84–55 loss to Brose Bamberg, as he played 28 seconds.

Los Angeles Lakers (2018–2019)
On May 1, 2017, Bonga signed with agents Jason Ranne and Thad Foucher to enter the 2018 NBA draft, and entered the 2018 NBA draft as one of 54 international players to enter the draft that year. On June 21, 2018, Bonga was selected with the 39th overall pick in the 2018 NBA draft by the Philadelphia 76ers on behalf of the Los Angeles Lakers. On July 6, the Lakers officially acquired Bonga in a trade involving the 76ers trading him to the Lakers in exchange for a 2019 second round pick and cash considerations. After the acquisition, he signed a rookie scale contract with the Lakers. He was assigned to their NBA G League team South Bay Lakers on October 22, after having appeared in preseason contests for the Los Angeles Lakers. In his G League debut on November 3, Bonga scored 27 points in a 108–106 loss to the Stockton Kings.

He made his NBA debut on December 7, 2018, playing one minute and seven seconds against the San Antonio Spurs. On December 20, 2018, Bonga was sent back to the G League. Bonga saw the hardwood in 22 games in his NBA rookie season to average 0.9 points and 1.1 rebounds. In G League play, he tallied 11.9 points per game in 31 contests as a rookie.

Washington Wizards (2019–2021)
On July 5, 2019, Bonga was traded to the Washington Wizards in a three-team trade. With the Wizards, he averaged 5 points, 3.4 rebounds, 1.2 assists per game in his first year (2019-20). In the 2020-21 season, he averaged 2 points, 1.7 rebounds and .6 assists per contest.

Toronto Raptors (2021–2022)
Bonga signed with the Toronto Raptors as a free agent on August 12, 2021. He saw action in 15 regular season games and had one playoff appearance, but never broke through.

FC Bayern München (2022–present) 
On August 19, 2022, Bonga inked a two-year deal with German powerhouse FC Bayern München.

Career statistics

NBA

Regular season

|-
| style="text-align:left;"| 
| style="text-align:left;"| L.A. Lakers
| 22 || 0 || 5.5 || .152 || .000 || .600 || 1.1 || .7 || .4 || .2 || .9
|-
| style="text-align:left;"| 
| style="text-align:left;"| Washington
| 66 || 49 || 18.9 || .504 || .352 || .812 || 3.4 || 1.2 || .7 || .3 || 5.0
|-
| style="text-align:left;"| 
| style="text-align:left;"| Washington
| 40 || 8 || 10.8 || .370 || .277 || .625 || 1.7 || .6 || .3 || .2 || 2.0
|-
| style="text-align:left;"| 
| style="text-align:left;"| Toronto
| 15 || 0 || 4.6 || .231 || .250 || .625 || .5 || .3 || .5 || .1 || .8
|- class="sortbottom"
| style="text-align:center;" colspan="2"| Career
| 143 || 57 || 13.1 || .432 || .300 || .759 || 2.2 || .8 || .5 || .3 || 3.1

Playoffs

|-
| style="text-align:left;"| 2021
| style="text-align:left;"| Washington
| 4 || 0 || 2.5 || .000 || .000 || — || .0 || .0 || .0 || .3 || .0
|-
| style="text-align:left;"| 2022
| style="text-align:left;"| Toronto
| 1 || 0 || 3.0 || — || — || 1.000 || 1.0 || .0 || .0 || .0 || 2.0
|- class="sortbottom"
| style="text-align:center;" colspan="2"| Career
| 5 || 0 || 2.6 || .000 || .000 || 1.000 || .2 || .0 || .0 || .2 || .4

National team career
Bonga played at both the 2014 FIBA Europe Under-16 Championship and the 2015 FIBA Europe Under-16 Championship for the German under-16 national team. In 2017, he participated in the 2017 FIBA Under-19 Basketball World Cup with the German under-19 national team, averaging 6.6 points in seven contests en route to a fifth-place finish.

In November 2017, he was named to the senior German men's national team roster for the first time in his career, to take part in the qualifiers for the 2019 FIBA Basketball World Cup. Aged 18 and three months, he made his German senior national team debut on February 23, 2018, in a World Cup qualifier against Serbia, becoming the youngest German player to play for the senior team in 40 years. Bonga played for Germany at the 2020 Summer Olympics in Tokyo. In four appearances (four starts) at the Olympics, he averaged 8 points, 4.8 rebounds and 2.5 assists per contest.

References

External links
 Isaac Bonga at nba.com
 Isaac Bonga at fiba.com
 Issac Bonga at eurobasket.com

1999 births
Living people
Basketball players at the 2020 Summer Olympics
FC Bayern Munich basketball players
German men's basketball players
German sportspeople of Democratic Republic of the Congo descent
Los Angeles Lakers players
National Basketball Association players from Germany
Olympic basketball players of Germany
People from Neuwied
Philadelphia 76ers draft picks
Point guards
Raptors 905 players
Shooting guards
Skyliners Frankfurt players
Small forwards
South Bay Lakers players
Sportspeople from Rhineland-Palatinate
Toronto Raptors players
Washington Wizards players